El Corazón is a location in the Cotopaxi Province, Ecuador. It is the seat of the Pangua Canton.

References 
 www.inec.gov.ec
 www.ame.gov.ec

External links 
 Map of the Cotopaxi Province

Populated places in Cotopaxi Province